The Little Totara River is a river of the northwest  of New Zealand's South Island. It rises on the northern slopes of Mount Euclid in the Paparoa Range, flowing northwest to its confluence with the Tōtara River at the latter's mouth on the Tasman Sea seven kilometres north of Charleston.

It was designated as a nationally protected area in 1987 by the Department of Conservation.

See also
List of rivers of New Zealand

References

Rivers of the West Coast, New Zealand
Buller District
Rivers of New Zealand